The Michener Institute of Education at UHN, or simply Michener, is a specialist post-secondary institution in Toronto, Ontario, Canada. Based in Downtown Toronto and governed by the University Health Network (UHN), Canada's largest funded health care organization, Michener was founded by Diana Michener Schatz as the Toronto Institute of Medical Technology in 1958 with a pilot program in Medical Laboratory Technology at the Toronto General Hospital. After years of expansion through more programs offered, the institute was relocated to its present campus in 1972 at 222 St. Patrick Street and was renamed "The Michener Institute" after Schatz's father, Roland Michener (former Governor General of Canada) in 1990. The institute is funded by the Ontario Ministry of Health.

The Michener Institute consists of a School of Applied Health Sciences and a School of Continuing Education. Within its School of Applied Health Sciences, it offers certification in various medical technologies, including Chiropody, Cardiovascular Perfusion, Diagnostic Cytology, Medical Laboratory Science, Respiratory Therapy, Ultrasound, Radiation Therapy, and Genetics Technology. Michener Institute also offers a number of joint programs with the University of Toronto.

History

The Michener Institute was founded by Diana Michener Schatz under the name the Toronto Institute of Medical Technology. In 1958 the value of combining learning in an educational environment with clinical education in a teaching hospital was demonstrated by pilot program developed by hospital-based physicians and medical technologists. In 1990 the name was changed to the Michener Institute in honour of Schatz's father, Roland Michener, the 20th Canadian Governor General. In 2008, the Michener Institute celebrated 50 years in applied health science education. In 2016 Michener officially integrated with the University Health Network (UHN) to become the Michener Institute of Education at UHN, a partnership that embeds the school within the hospital network. The aim of the integration is to embed teaching in clinical practice and research, and to deliver more up-to-date and comprehensive education for students. It also aims to create better learning opportunities for working health care professionals and accelerate the transfer of academic research from the school labs into clinical practice.

The integration was inspired by the Mayo Clinic in Rochester, Minnesota, and is the first time such a partnership between a school and a hospital has existed in Canada.

Programs
Within its School of Applied Health Sciences, the Michener Institute offers 12 full-time programs, two part-time programs and many more continuing education programs. Some of Michener's full-time programs include: Chiropody, Genetics Technology, Medical Laboratory Sciences, Nuclear Medicine and Respiratory Therapy. The part-time programs are Anesthesia Assistant and Magnetic Resonance Imaging (MRI). The Michener Institute offers bachelor's degrees available through joint programs with the University of Toronto (Medical Radiation Sciences). In the past, Michener Institute also offered a joint program in Radiation Therapy with Laurentian University. This program was discontinued on April 12, 2021, as a result of Laurentian University's effort to restructure program offerings. Each program consists of a combination of didactic and clinical semesters.

Additionally, the institute offers a vast number of workshops, courses, and certificate programs within its School of Continuing Education.

On December 2, 2020, Michener Institute announced that a new full-time program was being developed "to meet the health system's need for digitally-literate health professionals." The new program titled Digital Health and Data Analytics will begin in September 2021 with enrolment opening in Spring 2021.

Arms

References

External links
The Michener Institute

Michener Institute, The
Michener Institute, The
Brutalist architecture in Canada
1958 establishments in Ontario